Dolichopteryx is a genus of barreleyes.

Species
There are currently 9 recognized species in this genus:
 Dolichopteryx anascopa A. B. Brauer, 1901
 Dolichopteryx andriashevi Parin, Belyanina & Evseenko, 2009
 Dolichopteryx longipes (Vaillant, 1888) (brownsnout spookfish)
 Dolichopteryx minuscula Fukui & Kitagawa, 2006 
 Dolichopteryx parini Kobyliansky & Fedorov, 2001 (winged spookfish)
 Dolichopteryx pseudolongipes Fukui, Kitagawa & Parin, 2008 (spookfish) 
 Dolichopteryx rostrata Fukui & Kitagawa, 2006 
 Dolichopteryx trunovi Parin, 2005
 Dolichopteryx vityazi Parin, Belyanina & Evseenko, 2009

References

Opisthoproctidae
Taxa named by August Brauer
Marine fish genera
Ray-finned fish genera